Paul Lukather (August 24, 1926 – October 9, 2014) was a veteran actor known for his vast array of work across stage, television and voice-over work.

Lukather graduated from Drake University and Yale University. He won the Barter Award, which was given to the year's most outstanding young actor, and he acted in productions of the Barter Theatre.

For most of the 1960s, 1970s and 1980s, Lukather worked in television and film; from the late 1980s into the 1990s, he primarily worked as a voice-over artist known for many video games, including the Legacy of Kain series where he voiced Vorador. He also had a role in Metal Gear Solid 2: Sons of Liberty where he did the English voice-over for President James Johnson.

Lukather made dozens of television appearances on Perry Mason, The Fugitive, The F.B.I., Mission: Impossible, Cannon, and many others. In 1966 he guest starred on Perry Mason as defendant 'Duke' Maronek in "The Case of the Misguided Model".

Lukather died on October 9, 2014, aged 88.

Filmography

Live-action

 Make Haste to Live (1954) – Deputy
 Mohawk (1956) – Angry Settler (uncredited)
 Drango (1957) – Burke
 The True Story of Lynn Stuart (1958) – Plainclothesman (uncredited)
 Dinosaurus! (1960) – Chuck
 77 Sunset Strip (1960, TV Series) – Scooter / Steve Lucy
 All Hands on Deck (1961) – Sailor (uncredited)
 Hands of a Stranger (1962) – Dr. Gil Harding
 Captain Newman, M.D. (1963) – Pilot (uncredited)
 Shock Treatment (1964) – 2nd Young Interne (uncredited)
 I'd Rather Be Rich (1964) – Reporter (uncredited)
 Fate Is the Hunter (1964) – News Reporter (uncredited)
 The Outer Limits (1964–1965, TV Series) – Ed Nichols / Official
 The Man from U.N.C.L.E. (1965, TV Series) – Capt. Ahmed
 Bonanza (1960–1965, TV Series) – Cletus / Robie
 Get Smart (1966) – Baccardo
 Perry Mason (1963–1966, TV Series) – Dennis 'Duke' Maronek / Alan Jaris / Chuck Emmett
 Alvarez Kelly (1966) – Capt. Webster
 The Fugitive (1964–1966, TV Series) – First deputy / Barney / McNeil's Photographer
 Twelve O'Clock High (1965–1966, TV Series) – Staff Sgt. Pargon / Lieutenant O'Toole
 The Way West (1967) – Mr. Turley
 The F.B.I. (1966–1968, TV Series) – Lee Holm / Jack Allis / Phil Sandrich / Eddie
 Mission: Impossible (1967–1969, TV Series) – Lieutenant / Moisev
 Bright Promise (1969, TV Series) – William Ferguson (1969–1971)
 The Mod Squad (1969, TV Series) – Mike Reynolds
 Mannix (1973, TV Series) – Gerald Stockton
 Adam-12 (1975, TV Series) – Dave Morris
 Cannon (1973–1976, TV Series) – Dr. Andrew Stoner / Morgan
 Starsky and Hutch (1977, TV Series) – Max Frost
 Hot Lead and Cold Feet (1978) – Cowboy 2
 Friday the 13th: The Final Chapter (1984) – Doctor
 Cagney & Lacey  (1985, TV Series) – Garth
 Cheers (1986, TV Series) – Mr. Morton
 Chloe's Prayer (2006) – Paul

Video game
 Blood Omen: Legacy of Kain (1996) – Vorador, Bane (voice)
 Alundra 2 (2000) – Narrator / High Priest A / Pirate A (voice)
 Soul Reaver 2 (2001) – Vorador (voice)
 Metal Gear Solid 2: Sons of Liberty (2001) – James Johnson (voice)
 Blood Omen 2 (2002) – Vorador (voice)
 Arc the Lad: Twilight of the Spirits (2003) – Zev (voice)
 Legacy of Kain: Defiance (2003) – Vorador (voice)

References

External links

 
 Paul Lukathers obituary can be read in the excerpt of this book of obituaries. It is in alphabetical order.

1926 births
2014 deaths
American male television actors
American male voice actors